Malcolm Edwin Nichols (May 8, 1876 – February 7, 1951) was a journalist and a U.S. political figure. Nichols served as the Mayor of Boston in the late 1920s. He came from a Boston Brahmin family and was the most recent Republican to serve in that post.

Early years
Nichols was the son of Edwin T. Nichols and Helen J. G. (Pingree) Nichols. He was married on December 16, 1915, to Edith M. Williams (died 1925). They had three children, sons Clark S. and Dexter, and daughter Marjorie. In 1926 he married Edith's twin sister Carrie Marjorie Williams.  His son Clark acted as his best man and his son Dexter acted as the ring bearer.

Career

Journalism
Nichols was the Massachusetts State House reporter for The Boston Traveler, covering both houses of the legislature, and later a political reporter for The Boston Post.

Public service
In addition to his newspaper work, Nichols was a lawyer and Port Collector of Internal Revenue. He was a member of the Massachusetts House of Representatives, 1907–09, representing Ward 10 of Boston (the Back Bay), where he was a member and clerk of the House Committee on Metropolitan affairs. He was a member of the Massachusetts Senate, 1914, 1917–19, and was elected Mayor of Boston in November 1925, serving in office from 1926 to 1930. He was an unsuccessful candidate for mayor in November 1933, November 1937, and November 1941.

Personal life
Nichols was a Swedenborgian and of English ancestry. He was a member of the Freemasons, Shriners, and Elks. Nichols died of a heart attack, in Jamaica Plain, Boston, Suffolk County, Massachusetts, on February 7, 1951.  He was interred in Forest Hills Cemetery in the Jamaica Plain neighborhood of Boston.

See also
 1917 Massachusetts legislature
 1918 Massachusetts legislature
 1919 Massachusetts legislature
 Timeline of Boston, 1900s–1920s

References

Bibliography
Acts and Resolves Passed by the General Court by the Secretary of the Commonwealth (1918) p. 554.
Who's who in State Politics, 1908 Practical Politics  (1908) p. 265.

External links
Malcolm E. Nichols entry at The Political Graveyard
Nichols election records at ourcampaigns.com

1876 births
1950 deaths
American political journalists
American Swedenborgians
Harvard College alumni
Republican Party Massachusetts state senators
Mayors of Boston
Republican Party members of the Massachusetts House of Representatives
Politicians from Portland, Maine
Writers from Portland, Maine
The Boston Post people